("South German Monthly", also credited as ) was a German magazine published in Munich between January 1904 and September 1936. After beginnings as an art and literary venue, liberal but highly critical of modernism, it made a turn toward politics before World War I. Especially supportive of German conservatism, it was also sympathetic toward Völkisch ideologists, and published propaganda in favor of militarist politicians such as Alfred von Tirpitz. Having for its founder and editor Paul Nikolaus Cossmann, an assimilated Jew,  was generally antisemitic—strongly so after 1920, when it hosted calls for racial segregation.

Its publication of conspiracy theories such as the stab-in-the-back myth paved the way for Nazi propaganda, but  was more closely aligned with the mainstream right. It played a part in conspiratorial alliances supporting the policies of Gustav von Kahr, although it also had Conservative Revolutionaries among its core contributors. In its late years,  turned to Bavarian nationalism and Wittelsbach loyalism, becoming a target for the Nazi regime. Cossmann was imprisoned for dissidence, then deported for his Jewishness;  took over, leading  until its disestablishment in 1936.

Beginnings
Established as a mainly social-liberal tribune by Cossmann, a Jewish writer who had converted to Catholicism,  initially sought to reaffirm the cultural importance of Southern Germany and solidify its symbiotic relationship with Prussia, creating cultural bridges between Catholics and Protestants. Joining the directorial staff in the first edition was liberal pastor-politician Friedrich Naumann (its political director to 1913), who shared editorial oversight with painter Hans Thoma and composer Hans Pfitzner. Protestant social reformer  and Joseph Schnitzer, a Modernist Catholic, were noted guest writers, with Cossmann acting as neutral host. During the federal election of 1907, the magazine hosted debates between Schnitzer and Center Party militant , on Political Catholicism and its role in society (a divisive one, according to Schnitzer). However, according to historian Adam R. Seipp,  was mainly an interface for traditional Munich—Catholic, "deeply conservative", "suspicious of outside influences", and antithetical to the modernist Simplicissimus.

Cossmann managed to attract important writers to the magazine's permanent staff, including  and Karl Alexander von Müller.

Some of the cultural and social chronicles had nationalist undertones, debating over the requirements of German modernization. As Anglophiles, Hofmiller, Lujo Brentano, and  suggested fusing Anglo–American lessons in modernity with the German Volkstum, to make Germany a more competitive capitalist nation; in 1906, a Dr. Paul Tesdorf went further, promoting eugenics as a means to engineer a better people. In contrast, Naumann and other authors worried about finance capitalism and oligopolies, exhorting a German nationalism based on "democratic capitalism" or syndicalism, and following closely the development of Marxist revisionism. In a February 1906 obituary for the "legal socialist" Anton Menger, Eugen Ehrlich commented that the term "socialism" had virtually lost its mystique.

The magazine took a distinctly liberal position on education reform, with Rade supporting the Jewish studies movement. In 1909, the journal was also one of the first to host Hans Driesch's philosophical tracts, discussing the concept of becoming in history and nature. In 1913, it aired Moritz Geiger's grievances against experimental psychology, implicitly a defense of classical phenomenology.

Debates about innovation were carried into the artistic realm. An early contributor, Henry Thode, wrote articles which censured modern art from conservative and antisemitic positions, attacking modernist critics such as Julius Meier-Graefe. In 1911, the debate was taken further:  hosted both Carl Vinnen's manifesto against French "invasion" in German art, as well as the more cautious, pro-modernist, replies to Vinnen, from: Thoma, Lovis Corinth, Gustav Klimt, Max Klinger, Max Slevogt, Count Kalckreuth, Wilhelm Trübner, and Auguste Rodin. In various other issues,  carried polemical essays by aestheticists such as Rudolf Borchardt and Paul Zarifopol.

Wartime and revolution
Naumann resigned in protest against veiled accusations him in Pöhlmann's article, but also because the magazine had discarded liberal democracy.

 saluted the July 1914 Crisis and the outbreak of World War I: in the September issue, Karl Mayr wrote that the war signified "internal transformation". In 1916, Cossmann and his magazine defended Tirpitz's submarine war policy, submitting evidence that Tirpitz critic Veit Valentin had falsified military reports. These were times of notoriety for the magazine: prior to the war,  circulation stood at a few hundred copies, rising to 3000-5000 ca. 1914, and increasing sharply after that, reaching 100,000 at times.

The journal hosted topical literature on war politics and alarming reports from the field, including Spahn's coverage of civilian defeatism in Alsace-Lorraine. In 1915, Eduard Meyer, Georg Kerschensteiner, and Ludwig Curtius published here their thoughts on the political and historical revelations of war, introducing theses about nationalist rivalry as the source of progress and European civilization. Aiming to strengthen German propaganda in neutral Spain, the magazine hosted exposes depicting Iberian Federalism as a product of French intrigues, and homages to the conservative Mauristas.

Taking much interest in the "Jewish Question" in German-occupied Poland,  exaggerated the magnitude of conflicts between Jews and Poles. A special issue of February 1916 was dedicated to Ashkenazi Jews. Also featured were articles by Zionists Max Bodenheimer and Franz Oppenheimer, who purported that "Eastern Jews" were natural allies of German nationalism. Cossmann was also irritated by the "uncritical" views of Bodenheimer and his followers, which, he argued, were essentially "platitudes".

The editorship viewed the November 1918 Revolution and consequent fall of the monarchy as a disaster; its nationalist agitation was strengthened in the wake of the Munich Soviet Republic and the establishment of the Weimar Republic. In that context, its antisemitism also became more radical, integrating notions about "Jewish Bolshevism", and dropping ethical distinctions between assimilated and non-assimilated Jews, although Cossmann remained rather critical of such analogies. In February 1919, it became the first mainstream publication to host an article by Müller's brother-in-law Gottfried Feder. The self-taught economist and German Workers' Party ideologue explained his fight against "interest slavery", soon after developed into an explicitly antisemitic program. Its pessimistic prognosis was that world revolution had become an unstoppable "torrent".

Versailles and "stab-in-the-back" claim
Circulation remained high in 1918–1920, before steadily declining over the subsequent decade. Cossmann found backing from powerful industrialists, aristocrats, and Bavarian People's Party (BVP) figures, who also sponsored him and his secretary Franz von Gebsattel to buy and publish the daily , overbidding their Jewish competitors. This circle included Tirpitz, Prince  of the secretive Gäa-Club, Gustav von Kahr, Albert Vögler, and corporate backers from the Gute Hoffnungshütte. Although Kahr's ally, Cossmann did not support its regionalist platform, and was only interesting to Bavarian nationalists as an enemy of the Social Democratic Party (SPD). He was sympathetic toward Karl Jarres of the mainstream German People's Party, trying to obtain him votes from the BVP. In December 1922, however, he and other  men were involved in Tirpitz's conspiratorial project against Weimar, which discussed the creation of a German dictatorship under Kahr.

From 1921, Cossmann's magazine took notice of the emerging Conservative Revolutionary movement, accepting its critique of Völkisch traditionalism, and bringing in the radical sociologist  as a contributor. Another noted presence was philosopher Oswald Spengler, whose writings for  talked about recapturing the "spirit of 1914", theorized as a voluntarist reshaping of power relations. Spengler reassured Cossmann's readers that the Treaty of Versailles was a mere "pause for breath" in the otherwise unstoppable progress of Pan-Germanism.

The journal railed above all against Versailles' War Guilt Clause, campaigning for the return of German colonies, and publishing in 1924 Heinrich Schnee's highly popular tract,  ("The Lie of the Colonial Guilt"). In his contribution, the latter also sketched out a plan for German settlement in the East.

 also became notorious by advocating for the stab-in-the-back myth, according to which Germany had not been truly defeated in 1918, but betrayed from within. The accusation, backed by the Spenglerian philosophical stance (defeat was a failure of national will), was notably taken up by Cossmann—with a focus on the wartime Social Democrats. The Münchener Post responded by criticizing Cossmann, and Cossmann sued the Post editor, Martin Gruber, for libel; it became a celebrity trial. Cossmann won when Judge Hans Frank, himself a radical nationalist, ruled that he had acted in the public interest by publishing wartime letters attributed to SPD pacifist Felix Fechenbach.  helped instigate the political trial against Fechenbach.

Late 1920s polemics
In its final decade,  became "mainstream", a "serious journal of the conservative bourgeoisie", hosting contributions by right-wing assimilated Jews such as Leo Baeck, alongside antisemitic Germans like Theodor Fritsch, Ernst Jünger, and Count Reventlow. Like the BVP, it was ambiguous toward the nascent Nazi movement in the wake of the Nazis' Beer Hall Putsch. Spengler, who felt that Nazi adventurism had ruined his own budding project for an industrialist timocracy, broke with the Cossmann club, denouncing its failure to preclude the Putsch.

By 1927, the magazine again had a focus on eugenics, as well as racial hygiene and natalism. Hosting a topical essay by Spengler, it had contributions by eugenicists Otmar Freiherr von Verschuer, Alfred Ploetz, and Fritz Lenz. Issuing predictions about the "fate of our race", Lenz discussed the Nordic race in relation to the German people, while statistician Richard Korherr contributed Geburtenrückgank ("Birth Rate"), a much-read study of the West's population decline. These works were complimented in 1929 by a  essay on biopolitics and the alleged Slavic population pressure on Germany's eastern frontier, suggesting counteraction through German recolonization. In other ways the magazine contradicted Völkisch tenets. Sexologist Max von Gruber wrote that most of the "greatest men of our race" were not purely Nordic, but "hybrids", and that productive miscegenation was in the national character. Franz Spina's 1928 piece on the Sudeten Germans expressed support for a rapprochement between Germany and the Czechoslovak Republic. Also, as noted by historian Bernd Weisbrod, s racial antisemitism was of the moderate variety embraced by the National Populists. This was notably illustrated by its hosting, in September 1930, of an article by Jünger, in which the novelist suggested that self-segregation was "the most efficient weapon" against Jews.

Returning to its critique of cultural imports at the height of the international Jazz Age, the magazine was focusing its attacks on modern American culture, and especially its African component. Korherr and  took up Spenglerian themes about the "inconsiderate", "nihilistic", "Americanized" architecture of modern Berlin. Jünger's articles, however, showed leniency toward modernization and a more critical stance against Völkisch tropes: he conceived of the "German national revolution" as an urban uprising, and decried peasant conservatism as outdated, "doomed to failure".  writers were also undecided about the import of physical education and the Weimar youth's emphasis on recreational sport: Ulrich von Wilamowitz deplored these developments, while Wilhelm Wien saw in them signs of recovery from "the postwar chaos".

The popularity of German occultism and alternative medicine was examined by Cossmann's journal, over several issues. With articles by Sven Hedin and others, the magazine expressed skepticism against the fantastic travel accounts of F. Ossendowski, and against modern mysticism in general.

Nazi ascendancy to power
Shortly after the onset of the Great Depression,  resumed campaigning for "the revival of war generation" and the fulfillment of its "historical destiny"—themes central to the essays of Edgar Julius Jung, which saw print in Cossmann's magazine. In the late 1920s, Jung was outlining here his vision of neo-feudalism and grassroots democracy, as conservative resources against centralizing SPD governments. With monarchism on the decline, the journal still gave exposure to Wilhelm II's apologists, hosting 's 1929 study "The Monarchy in German History".

Some of the journal's contributors looked into new forms of authoritarianism. Jünger's 1930 text lambasted liberalism and Italian Fascism, noting that the latter only existed as a "simplified and shortened" version of the former. He envisaged a "stricter solution" to Germany's political and economic woes. After a republican Voluntary Labor Service came into force in 1932, an article by  celebrated its role in national pedagogy and social advancement.

The journal's conservative position was at odds with Nazism, just as the latter was growing in popularity and numerical strength. Cossmann himself rejected Nazi racial theory but, as sociologist Werner Jacob Cahnman has noted, his earlier work in propaganda had unwittingly given the Nazis "a rousing slogan and terrific impetus". According to Cahnman, Cossmann "just did not wish to see the writing on the wall".

In early 1933, Cossmann and his collaborator , who had openly criticized Adolf Hitler in 1923, called for a monarchist coup against the nascent Nazi regime that would see Crown Prince Rupprecht placed on the throne. Setting out its platform, the magazine's January cover bore the title "King Rupprecht". The pair were arrested and imprisoned. Cossmann, described by scholar Steven E. Aschheim as "a tragic victim of the breakdown of the German–Jewish symbiosis", was sent to the ghetto of Berg am Laim in 1941, and died at Theresienstadt concentration camp in 1942.

The magazine continued to run to 1936 under Nazi publisher , but became both insignificant and apolitical during this last phase. A late controversy came in October 1933, when Paul Wentzcke commemorated in his articles 1920s Rhenish separatism, depicting it as a popular self-help movement against Weimar incompetence.

Notes

References
Philippe Alexandre, "La société allemande et les défis de la modernité. Points de vue libéraux dans les Süddeutsche Monatshefte (1904–1914)", in Michel Grunewald, Uwe Puschner (eds.), Krisenwahrnehmungen in Deutschland um 1900. – Zeitschriften als Foren der Umbruchszeit im Wilhelminischen Reich/Perceptions de la crise en Allemagne au début du XXe siècle. – Les périodiques et la mutation de la société allemande à l'époque wilhelmienne, pp. 195–213. Bern: Peter Lang, 2010.  
Steven E. Aschheim, Brothers and Strangers: The East European Jew in German and German Jewish Consciousness, 1800–1923. Madison: University of Wisconsin Press, 1982.
Werner J. Cahnman, German Jewry: Its History and Sociology. New Brunswick: Transaction Publishers, 1989.  
David Thomas Murphy, The Heroic Earth. Geopolitical Thought in Weimar Germany, 1918–1933. Kent: Kent State University Press, 1997.
Raffael Scheck, Alfred Von Tirpitz and German Right-wing Politics: 1914—1930. Atlantic Highlands: Humanities Press International, 1998.  
Walter Struve, Elites Against Democracy: Leadership Ideals in Bourgeois Political Thought in Germany, 1890–1933. Princeton: Princeton University Press, 1973.
Corinna Treitel, A Science for the Soul: Occultism and the Genesis of the German Modern. Baltimore: Johns Hopkins University Press, 2004.  
Jeffrey Verhey, The Spirit of 1914. Militarism, Myth and Mobilization in Germany.  Cambridge: Cambridge University Press, 2000.

1904 establishments in Germany
1936 disestablishments in Germany
Anti-American sentiment in Germany
Antisemitic publications
Antisemitism in Germany
Bavarian nationalism
Bavarian Soviet Republic
Conservative magazines published in Germany
Conservative Revolutionary movement
Defunct literary magazines published in Germany
Eugenics in Germany
History of eugenics
German Empire in World War I
German-language magazines
Magazines established in 1904
Magazines disestablished in 1936
Magazines published in Munich
Monarchism in Germany
Pan-Germanism
Social liberalism
Visual arts magazines published in Germany
World War I propaganda